Kaagaz Ke Fools  is a 2015 Indian comedy film directed by Anil Kumar Chaudhary and produced by Faisal Kapadia and Arun Bhairav under the Globe Filmy Entertainment banner. The film was released on 24 April 2015.

Cast 
Vinay Pathak as Purushottam Tripathi
Mugdha Godse as Nikki
Raima Sen as Rubina
Saurabh Shukla as Dev
Rajendra Sethi as Kuku
Amit Behl as Vinay
Nishikant Dixit as Inspector

Plot 
Revolving around a middle-class family, Kaagaz Ke Fools touches upon the issue of lack of good novel writers.

Production 
The title is a pun of the 1959 film Kaagaz Ke Phool.

Reception

Critical response 
Kaagaz Ke Fools received generally negative reviews from critics. The film is one of the worst movie of 2015. Shubhra Gupta of The Indian Express stated, "You keep wanting this film to ‘ho ja shuru’, but ‘Kaagaz Ke Fools’ doesn't have the feet for it."

Ratings 
Sushmita Murthy of Deccan Chronicle gave the film 1/5 stars and stated, "The name of the film leads you to believe that Kaagaz ke Fools is a comedy, but it is at best, an attempt at it with rather painful results."

Shubha Shetty-Saha of Mid-Day giving the same ratings stated, "The 1959 Guru Dutt classic 'Kaagaz Ke Phool' was so ahead of its time that it tanked at the Box Office, and later got elevated to world cult classic status. Ironically, and perhaps reflecting the sad state of Bollywood’s growth, in 2015 we get a film titled 'Kaagaz ke Fools', which is so regressive and dated that it just might have made some sense back in the 50s. Well, if nothing, the film makes us painfully aware of the difference between a phool and a fool."

Soundtrack 
The soundtrack for the album was composed by Sangeeta Pant and lyrics were penned by Sangeeta Pant, Ravi Basnet.

References

External links 
 
 

2015 films
2010s Hindi-language films
Indian comedy-drama films
Films shot in Mumbai
2015 comedy-drama films
2015 comedy films